Dixey is a surname. Notable people with the name include:

 Arthur Dixey (1889–1954), British Member of Parliament of the Conservative Party
 Frederick Augustus Dixey (1855–1935), English entomologist
 Henry E. Dixey (1859–1943), American actor and theatre producer
Mary Dixey (born 1961), American former rugby union player
Neville Dixey (1881–1947),  British Liberal Party politician
Paul Dixey (born 1987), former English professional cricketer
Phyllis Dixey (1914–1964), English singer, dancer and impresario
Richard Dixey (born 1956), English former footballer

See also
Mount Dixey, a mountain in Antarctica
Dixie (name)
Dixy (disambiguation)